Fernando Martínez Aldana (born June 14, 1977, in Tlalnepantla de Baz, State of Mexico) is a Mexican football manager and former player.

External links

1977 births
Living people
Club Puebla players
Liga MX players
Mexican football managers
Footballers from the State of Mexico
People from Tlalnepantla de Baz
Association footballers not categorized by position
Mexican footballers